The Psalter of Henry VIII is a 16th-century illuminated psalter that belonged to Henry VIII of England. It is now in the British Library as MS Royal 2 A xvi.  The king commissioned the book in the early 1540s from the French illuminator Jean Mallard, who had at one time worked for Francis I. The psalter contains eight miniatures, amongst them scenes of Henry playing the harp with his jester Will Somers in attendance, and of the king reading in his bedroom. Two scenes show Henry as King David: in one killing Goliath, in the other in the role of a penitent. The book has marginal annotations made by the king.

Henry's Psalter can be viewed - the full 1540 book, complete with Henry's own handwritten notes in the margins at the British Library's Virtual Books website here or on the British Library's Digitised Manuscripts website, here.

References
 British Library (old) catalogue description
 

Illuminated psalters
1540s books
Henry VIII
British Library Royal manuscripts